Obinitsa (also known as Obiniste, Abinitsa, Kirikmäe) is a village in Setomaa Parish, Võru County, southeastern Estonia. It has a population of 147 (as of 1 January 2022).

The Meremäe-Obinitsa Primary School was closed in 2009, after that the building is used as a nursing home.

Obinitsa is the Finno-Ugric Capital of Culture in 2015.

Obinitsa School-Church

Obinitsa School-Church is an Estonian Apostolic Orthodox Church. It is located in Obinitsa, about 280 kilometers from Tallinn. Construction of the church began in 1896 and its official inauguration came in 1897. On 16 December 1894, land was allocated for a church and school by the Obinitsa village community. The Church was closed in 1950. The bell tower was dismantled and the building turned into a school.

Gallery

See also
The Obinitsa Church of Transfiguration of Our Lord

References

Villages in Võru County
Setomaa Parish